The women's 4 × 110 yards relay event at the 1966 British Empire and Commonwealth Games was held on 14 August at the Independence Park in Kingston, Jamaica. It was the last time that the imperial distance was contested at the Games later replaced by the 4 × 100 metres relay.

Results

References

Athletics at the 1966 British Empire and Commonwealth Games
1966